Hubal was a god worshipped in pre-Islamic Arabia.

Hubal may also refer to:
Henryk Dobrzanski, a Polish soldier who used the pseudonym "Hubal"
Hubal (film), a 1973 Polish historical film 
Vasyl Hubal (born 1967), Ukrainian politician

See also